Armenian PowerSpell — the electronic corrector for texts in the modern Armenian language used in Armenia. Checks spelling, grammar, punctuation, slang and some semantic errors specific to texts in the Armenian language. Program was widely adopted in Armenia, and among the Armenian diaspora which uses the modern Armenian language. Today the product is used by almost all state and many educational institutions of Armenia.

Singularities 
As it is described in the overview article on a product site, it is developed specially for realities of the modern Armenia taking into account many foreign words which were extended in the Armenian language during the Soviet and Post-Soviet periods. A singularity of a product that it checks errors specific to people with Russian education, and it is adapted on parallel training of the user to the Armenian language. In particular the product is capable to translate the text with usage of the Armenian slang in its literary format, and also to display learning hints.
Many words speaking another language used in the Armenian texts, formally don't exist in the Armenian language because of what have no strict rules of a spelling, however the product wide circulation has allowed to standardize writing of many terms and words speaking another language.

Possibilities 
The following information related to Armenian PowerSpell 2011
 Spelling, on the basis of the basic dictionary in 850,000 words
 Check about 7 million word forms and sheaves of words.
 Check of grammar and a punctuation with an output of learning helps
 Check of a slang with transfer possibility in a literary format
 Check of words speaking another language and terms
 Check of wrong declination of correctly made words (specific to the Armenian language)
 Check of words with double sense on the correct use
 the Restricted analysis of sentences on possibility of the passed word.

Platforms 
The product is supported for a platform of Microsoft Windows and integrated into all versions of Microsoft Office 2000–2010, old versions worked only in Microsoft Word

History 
Older versions of a product were called Armenian Orfo (ArmOrfo)
 2000 — Armenian Orfo (ArmOrfo) 2000 (only spelling, based on dictionary with 130,000 words)
 2005 — Armenian PowerSpell 2005 (only spelling, based on dictionary with 200,000 words)
 2009 — Armenian PowerSpell 2009 (spelling, grammar and non-Armenian words checker, based on dictionary with 570,000 words)
 2010 — Armenian PowerSpell 2011

Criticism 
The first release of the program PowerSpell 2009 from March, 1st 2009, was exposed to the rigid criticism for the high price policy, critics however recognized that program was most complete solution for spelling of the Armenian language. Meanwhile, distributors don't agree with this judgement stating that the price policy ($24 per year, including annual new versions) programs is accessible to the country population, as has served its propagation.

Known Problems 
According to information present on product website, the program uses macro program to integrate itself into Microsoft Office. In case if macro security level is high, then program will not be installed correctly.

Distribution 
Program is developed by Arman Boshyan and is distributed by the company "Leader Profi" LTD registered in Armenia.

Struggle against a piracy 
Piracy propagation of a product, has led to the full paralysis of its development in 2002, activity on product development has been stopped up to 2005. New realities of Armenia allow to struggle with a piracy through judicial instances, the law on the copyright became better to be observed, in particular, after discovery of representation Microsoft in Armenia.

See also 
Modern Armenian language spell checker programs
 Armspell Project
 Microsoft Armenian Language Pack

Related External Links 
 Official page of Armenian PowerSpell
 Norq.Am - Armenian PowerSpell recognizes 97% of Armenian words and correct mistakes
 Armenian Language National Inspectorate - Armenian PowerSpell 2011 provides 99% of language coverage (Press Release)
 Mediamax Agency - New version of Armenian PowerSpell available (Press Release)
 PanArmenian.Net - Armenian PowerSpell 2010 program version to be released
 Hetq (Newspaper)- New Armenian Spell Check Program 97% Accurate
 Interview to agency Mediamax and portal Itel.am - Armenian PowerSpell 2011 has solved a new complex of tasks (Russian)

References 

Spell checkers
Armenian language